Cryptocarya elegans is a species of trees in the family Lauraceae. The species native range is the samoa islands.

References

External links 

elegans
Plants described in 1951